Çukurca District is a district in the Hakkâri Province of Turkey. The district had a population of 14,333 in 2022 with the town of Çukurca as its seat.

The district has more unpopulated settlements than populated ones.

The district was established in 1953.

Settlements

Villages 
The district has sixteen villages of which eight are unpopulated: 

 Akkaya
 Cevizli
 Çağlayan
 Çayırlı
 Çığlı
 Çinarlı
 Dede
 Gündeş
 Işıklı
 Kavaklı
 Kavuşak
 Kayalık
 Kazan
 Kurudere
 Narlı
 Üzümlü

There are moreover thirty-four hamlets in the district.

Governance 
The current mayor is Tahir Sakli from the Justice and Development Party (AKP) and the current district governor (kaymakam) is Yakup Güven.

Population 
Population history from 2007 to 2022:

References 

Çukurca District
States and territories established in 1953